Saali Poori Gharawali is a Hindi B grade comedy Drama Film movie directed and produced by Yogendra Konkar. This film was released on 10 November 2000 in the banner of Sharayu Arts.

Plot
Young Kamesh is an unhappy man lives with his wife Kanchan. Kanchan is less interested about their sexual life and always busy in useless rituals. One day Kanchan's sister Kamini comes their home. She is attractive and jovial. Frustrated Kamesh falls in love with his Saali (Sister-in-law). As a result, Kanchan realises that their conjugal relationship should be more strong.

Cast
 Satish Shah
 Dolly Bindra
 Yogendra Konkar
 Hitesh Sampat
 Mahesh Kawal
 Ajay Shah
 Jay Devi

References

External links 
 

2000 films
2000s Hindi-language films
Indian erotic drama films
2000s erotic drama films
2000 drama films